Cherry Crush is a 2007 film.

Cherry Crush may also refer to:

 Cherry Crush (novel)
 Cherry Crush, a soft drink flavor
 "Cherry Crush", a song on the eponymous album Nobody's Angel
 "Cherry Crush", a song by Chopper One on Now Playing

See also
 Cherry Rush, an EP by Cherry Bullet